George Adomian (March 21, 1922 – June 17, 1996) was an American mathematician of Armenian descent who developed the Adomian decomposition method (ADM) for solving nonlinear differential equations, both ordinary and partial. The method is explained, among other places, in his book Solving Frontier Problems in Physics: The Decomposition Method (Kluwer, Dordrecht, 2004). He was a faculty member at the University of Georgia (UGA) from 1966 through 1989. While at UGA, he started the Center for Applied Mathematics. Adomian was also an aerospace engineer.

Selected works
 G. Adomian: Stochastic Systems, Academic Press, 1983. 
 G. Adomian: Nonlinear Stochastic Operator Equations, Academic Press, 1986. 
 G. Adomian: Nonlinear Stochastic Systems Theory and Applications to Physics, Kluwer Academic Publishers, 1989.

References
 Members of the Faculty of the Mathematics Department University of Georgia

1922 births
1996 deaths
20th-century American mathematicians
American people of Armenian descent
Place of birth missing
Place of death missing
University of Georgia faculty
Mathematicians from Georgia (U.S. state)